"Shmunk" is a song by American rapper Yeat featuring fellow American rapper YoungBoy Never Broke Again, released on February 24, 2023, as the second track from the former's third studio album, Afterlyfe. On the trap banger, Yeat raps for the majority of the track about his exceedingly high income, whereas YoungBoy raps about firearms and murder.

Composition
"Shmunk" employs "a warped bop" with "dancehall beats and melodic acoustic strings also eas[ing] their way into the production".

Critical reception
HotNewHipHops Caleb Hardy noted that YoungBoy "is the one exception" to Yeat's attempt to "make up for the distinct lack of features by ushering in his alter-personas". On the track, YoungBoy "delivers a much-needed alternative voice". Hardy also noted that Yeat "shows out with braggadocios bars, chiefly about having stacks of cash, buying new cars, and wearing designer brands".

Charts

References

2023 songs
Yeat songs
YoungBoy Never Broke Again songs
Songs written by YoungBoy Never Broke Again